Paola López (born 21 April 1974) is an Argentine rower. She competed in the women's single sculls event at the 2000 Summer Olympics.

References

1974 births
Living people
Argentine female rowers
Olympic rowers of Argentina
Rowers at the 2000 Summer Olympics
Place of birth missing (living people)